Turkana Central Constituency is an electoral constituency in Kenya. It is one of six constituencies in Turkana County. The constituency was established for the 1988 elections.

Members of Parliament

Wards

References 

Constituencies in Rift Valley Province
Constituencies in Turkana County
1988 establishments in Kenya
Constituencies established in 1988